Dejan Ivanović (born 8 November 1994) is a Serbian football forward who plays for FK Kozara.

References

1994 births
Living people
Sportspeople from Vukovar
Association football forwards
Serbian footballers
OFK Kikinda players
People from the Republic of Serbian Krajina